Altınpark (literally Golden Park) is a public park in Ankara, Turkey

Geography 
Altınpark is in Altındağ district of Ankara, situated on the way connecting Ankara to Ankara airport. The park area is

History 
Up to 1977, the park area was a golf course. In 1985, it was transformed into a public park by the metropolitan municipality of Ankara.

The park today 
Among the buildings, Feza Gürsey Science Center is one of the best known building. Olympic swimming pool, kindergarten and summer schools, musical and lightened water exhibitions, game and entertainment areas, amphitheatres, crashing boats, electrical excursion cars, mini excursion train, and horse carts are among the other activities. There are also kiosks and restaurants within the park.

Gallery

References

External links 
ANFA, the management

Parks in Ankara
Urban public parks
1985 establishments in Turkey